Morey Leonard Sear (February 26, 1929 – September 6, 2004) was a United States district judge of the United States District Court for the Eastern District of Louisiana.

Education and career

Born in New Orleans, Louisiana, Sear received a Juris Doctor from Tulane University Law School in 1950. He was a Captain in the United States Marine Corps from 1950 to 1952. He was an assistant district attorney of the Parish of Orleans, Louisiana from 1952 to 1955. He was in private practice in New Orleans from 1955 to 1971, serving as special counsel to the New Orleans Aviation Board from 1956 to 1959.

Federal judicial service

Sear served as a United States magistrate judge for the United States District Court for the Eastern District of Louisiana from 1971 to 1976. On March 30, 1976, Sear was nominated by President Gerald Ford to a seat on that court vacated by Judge James August Comiskey. Sear was confirmed by the United States Senate on May 6, 1976, and received his commission on May 7, 1976. He served as a Judge of the Temporary Emergency Court of Appeals from 1982 to 1993. He served as Chief Judge from 1992 to 1999, assuming senior status on October 31, 2000, and serving in that capacity until his death on September 6, 2004, in New Orleans.

Notable case

In 1981, Sear presided over the three-month BriLab trial of Carlos Marcello, Aubrey W. Young, and Charles E. Roemer, II, on charges of conspiracy, racketeering, and mail, and wire fraud in a scheme to defraud the state through multimillion-dollar insurance contracts. Roemer, the father of future Governor Buddy Roemer and Marcello, a New Orleans crime figure, were convicted and imprisoned for conspiracy, but Young, a former aide to Governor John J. McKeithen and current staffer to then Lieutenant Governor Robert "Bobby" Freeman, was acquitted of all charges.

See also
List of Jewish American jurists

References

Sources
 

1929 births
2004 deaths
Judges of the United States District Court for the Eastern District of Louisiana
United States district court judges appointed by Gerald Ford
20th-century American judges
Tulane University alumni
Tulane University Law School alumni
United States Marine Corps officers
United States magistrate judges
Louisiana Republicans